Danna Paola, Mexican singer and actress, has won 87 awards out of 122 nominations.

Kids Choice Awards

Nickelodeon Kids' Choice Awards

Kids Choice Awards Mexico

Shorty Awards

MTV Awards

MTV Europe Music Awards (MTV EMA)

MTV Italy Awards

MTV Millennial Awards

YouTube Music Awards

Universal Awards

Premios Oye!

Premios Juventud

Latin Grammy Awards

Lunas del Auditorio

Premios TVyNovelas

E! Entertainment Television Awards

Fashion Police

Yahoo! Awards

Terra Awards

El Heraldo de México Awards

Premios Bravo

ACPT Awards

Festival Internacional de Teatro Héctor Azar

Aplauso Basta (Editorial Basta)

References

Lists of awards received by actor
Danna Paola